Francis Woodahl (1938–1984) was a 20th-century Native American artist from Baltimore, Maryland.  He later resided in Garden Grove, California.  He is popular for his western realist paintings.
 
Francis Woodahl started his career in Southern California and toured much of the United States in various Art Shows that were held in major shopping malls.  He was known for painting landscapes, mostly in oil, before moving on to painting with watercolor and egg-tempera on board.

Francis Woodahl's talent was discovered early on when he was granted a scholarship to the Maryland Institute of Art. He then went on to work as an illustrator for the Navy while serving on the USS Yorktown. Francis Woodahl was the founder of the Western Artists of America and was also recognized for his mastering of oil, tempera and acrylic painting in Native American Western art styles and the realism of his color palette blending methods which make him one of the top Western realism artists of his time. He has had many galleries that have and are currently showing his work in Arizona, California, Texas and throughout the United States.

References

1938 births
1989 deaths
American artists